Robert Moodie may refer to:
Rob Moodie (lawyer) (born 1938), New Zealand lawyer and cross dresser
Rob Moodie (doctor) (born 1953), Australian doctor, previously CEO of the Victorian Health Promotion Foundation
Robert Moodie (British Army officer) (1778–1837), British army officer who settled in Canada

See also
Robert Moody (born 1941), Canadian mathematician
Robert M. Moody (born 1939), American bishop
Robert Mudie (1777–1842), editor and author